Glyn  is a Welsh name.

Notable people with the name include:

Surnames

Alan Glyn (1918–1998), Conservative Party (UK) Member of Parliament
Andrew Glyn (1943–2007), UK-based economist and lecturer at the University of Oxford
Elinor Glyn (1864–1943), British novelist and scriptwriter
Frederick Glyn, 4th Baron Wolverton (1864–1932), British banker and Conservative politician
Gareth Glyn (born 1951), Welsh composer and radio broadcaster
George Glyn, 1st Baron Wolverton (1797–1873), banker with interests in the railways
George Grenfell Glyn, 2nd Baron Wolverton, PC (1824–1887), a British Liberal politician
Guto'r Glyn (1435–1493), Welsh language poet
Gwyneth Glyn (born 1979), Welsh language poet and musician
Isabella Glyn (1823–1889), Victorian-era Shakespearean actress
John Plumptre Carr Glyn (1837–1912), KCB, a British general
Pascoe Glyn (1833–1904), British businessman and Liberal politician
Ralph Glyn, 1st Baron Glyn (1884–1960), MC DL, a soldier and Conservative Party politician in the UK
Richard Thomas Glyn (1831-1900), British Army general
Sidney Glyn (1835–1916), British politician
Sir Richard Glyn, 1st Baronet, of Ewell (1711–1773), British banker and politician
Sir Richard Glyn, 1st Baronet, of Gaunt's House (1755–1838), British banker and politician
Sir Richard Glyn, 9th Baronet OBE (1907–1980), TD, DL, a British army officer and Conservative politician
William Glyn, American tennis player
William Glyn (bishop) (or Glynn or Glynne, 1504–1558), Bishop of Bangor

Given name
Dafydd Glyn Jones (born 1941), Welsh scholar and lexicographer
Edmund John Glyn Hooper (1818–1889), Canadian businessman and political figure
Glyn Barker (born 1953), British businessman
Glyn Barnett (born 1970), British international rifleman
Glyn Berry (1946–2006), Canadian diplomat killed by a car bomb in Afghanistan
Glyn Cannon (born 1976), British playwright
Glyn Daniel (1914–1986), Welsh scientist who specialised in the European Neolithic
Glyn Davidge (1933–2006), Welsh rugby player
Glyn Davies (economist) (1919–2003), Welsh economist
Glyn Davies (British politician) (born 1944), Welsh Conservative Party candidate for Montgomeryshire
Glyn Davis (born 1959), Australian academic and vice-chancellor of the University of Melbourne
Glyn Dearman (1939–1997), child actor
Glyn Ford (born 1950), Labour member of the European Parliament
Glyn Garner (born 1976), Welsh footballer
Glyn Gilbert (1920–2003), highest-ranking Bermudian soldier
Glyn Harman (born 1956), British mathematician working in analytic number theory
Glyn Hodges (born 1963), Welsh football manager and player
Glyn Houston (1925-2019), actor
Glyn James (born 1941), Welsh footballer
Glyn Johns (born 1942), musician, recording engineer and record producer
Glyn Jones (South African writer) (1931–2014), South African actor, writer and director
Glyn Jones (footballer, born 1959), Welsh footballer
Glyn Jones (Welsh writer) (1905–1995), Welsh author
Glyn Mason, 2nd Baron Blackford (1887–1972), UK Conservative Party politician
Glyn Maxwell (born 1962), British poet
Glyn Milburn (born 1971), American football player
Glyn Moody, technology writer
Glyn O'Malley (1951–2006), American playwright
Glyn Owen (1928–2004), British actor
Glyn Pardoe (born 1946), English footballer
Glyn Philpot (1884–1937), English artist
Glyn Prosser (1907–1972), Welsh rugby player
Glyn Smallwood Jones (1908–1992), British colonial administrator in Southern Africa
Glyn Stephens (1891–1965), Welsh rugby player
Glyn Stone, British historian
Glyn Thomas (1882–1967), musician
Glyn Thompson (born 1981), English footballer
Glyn Williams (footballer) (1918–2011), Welsh footballer
Glyn Worsnip (1938–1996), British radio and television presenter
Lewys Glyn Cothi (1420–1490), Welsh poet
Martin Glyn Murray (born 1966), Welsh actor
Rhodri Glyn Thomas AM (born 1953), Welsh politician
Thomas Glyn Watkin (born 1952), first person to be appointed as First Welsh Legislative Counsel
William Glyn Hughes Simon (1903–1972), Archbishop of Wales, 1968-71

Welsh masculine given names
Surnames of Welsh origin